Esnault-Pelterie is a lunar impact crater on the far side of the Moon, named after French rocketry and astronautics pioneer Robert Esnault-Pelterie. It is located in the northern hemisphere, to the south of the crater Carnot. Esnault-Pelterie overlies the western side of the crater Schlesinger. To the south is the crater Von Zeipel and to the southwest is Fowler.

The rim of this crater are somewhat worn, but still retain some structure and a relatively clear edge. There is a small crater attached to the southern rim that cuts into the interior through a narrow gap. Within the interior are several small craterlets, and a small rise offset to the north of the midpoint. There is a level region to the northeast of the central rise, and a smaller one to the southwest.

See also  
 French space program
 Astronautics

References

 
 
 
 
 
 
 
 
 
 
 
 

Impact craters on the Moon